Sergio Casal Martínez (born 8 September 1962) is a former professional tennis player from Spain. During his career, he won three Grand Slam doubles titles, as well as the men's doubles Silver Medal at the 1988 Summer Olympics.

Casal turned professional in 1981. He won his first top-level doubles title in 1983 at Aix-en-Provence. He captured a total of 47 men's doubles titles during his career. Partnering his fellow Spaniard Emilio Sánchez, he won the men's doubles titles at the US Open in 1988 and the French Open in 1990. The pair were also the men's doubles runners-up at Wimbledon in 1987 and won the Silver Medal for Spain at the 1988 Olympics in Seoul. Casal also won the US Open mixed doubles title in 1986, partnering Raffaella Reggi. Casal's career-high doubles ranking was World No. 3.

Casal also won one top-level singles title at Florence in 1985. He was a singles runner-up at Aix-en-Provence in 1983, and at the Paris Open in 1986. His career-high singles ranking was World No. 31.

Casal was a member of the Spanish team which won the World Team Cup in 1992.

He beat Boris Becker in a 1987 Davis Cup match.

Casal retired from the professional tour in 1995.

In 2017, he received from the International Tennis Federation (ITF) its highest accolade, the Philippe Chatrier award, for his contributions to tennis.

Grand Slam finals

Doubles: 3 (2 titles, 1 runner-up)

Mixed doubles: 1 (1 title)

Career finals

Doubles (47 wins, 26 losses)

Doubles performance timeline

References

External links
 
 
 
 

Tennis players from Catalonia
French Open champions
Olympic medalists in tennis
Olympic silver medalists for Spain
Olympic tennis players of Spain
Spanish male tennis players
Tennis players from Barcelona
Tennis players at the 1988 Summer Olympics
Tennis players at the 1992 Summer Olympics
US Open (tennis) champions
1962 births
Living people
Grand Slam (tennis) champions in mixed doubles
Grand Slam (tennis) champions in men's doubles
Medalists at the 1988 Summer Olympics